Davi Banda (born 29 December 1983 in Zomba) is a Malawian footballer who last played for Kamuzu Barracks FC in the Super League of Malawi.

Career
Banda began his career in his hometown for Zomba United. After four years, he transferred to city rivals Red Lions in 2007. and he moved to kamuzu barracks fc in 2015

International career
The midfielder is member of the Malawi national football team and is part of the 2010 African Cup of Nations team. On 11 January 2010 he scored his first goal for the national team against Algeria. He holds 17 caps below 6 FIFA national caps.

References

External links

1983 births
Living people
People from Zomba District
Malawian footballers
Malawi international footballers
2010 Africa Cup of Nations players
Association football midfielders
Red Lions FC (Malawi) players
Black Leopards F.C. players
Kamuzu Barracks FC players
Malawian expatriate footballers
Expatriate soccer players in South Africa
Malawian expatriate sportspeople in South Africa